Hambantota 2018 was an unsuccessful bid to stage the 2018 Commonwealth Games by the city of Hambantota, Sri Lanka. The right to host the Games was won by the Gold Coast 2018 bid after a 43-27 vote by the Commonwealth Games Federation (CGF) General Assembly on 11 November 2011 in Saint Kitts.

Background 
The city made their surprise bid for the Games on March 31, 2010.
Hambantota planned on building many new venues if it won the bid, including an athletics stadium, an aquatic centre, a multi-sports complex, a velodrome stadium and a hockey stadium. The athletes village would have been located around the Mahinda Rajapaksa International Stadium, which would have been one of the venues. The remaining venues would have been built near the cricket stadium. Unlike the Gold Coast's plan, which include venues in the nearby cities of Brisbane, Cairns and Townsville, Hambantota's venues were all planned for the same area.

Proposed venues

Proposed schedule
 
Hambantota proposed hosting the games between May 16 and 27, 2018. 17 sports and 228 events were planned to be contested if the bid was successful.

References

External links 
 Hambantota 2018 Bid website
 Hambantota 2018 Candidate City File: Volume 1
 Hambantota 2018 Candidate City File: Volume 2
 Hambantota 2018 Block Plans

2018 Commonwealth Games bids
Sport in Sri Lanka
Sri Lanka at the Commonwealth Games